Burlesque is a 2010 American backstage musical film written and directed by Steven Antin. It stars Cher, Christina Aguilera, Kristen Bell, Cam Gigandet, Stanley Tucci, Julianne Hough, Alan Cumming, and Peter Gallagher, and features cameos from Dianna Agron, and James Brolin. The film tells the story of Ali (Aguilera), an aspiring singer who leaves her small hometown for Los Angeles, where she becomes a dancer at a struggling burlesque lounge owned by Tess (Cher). After a performance is sabotaged by her rival, Nikki (Bell), Ali sings the song herself, impressing Tess and leading to her becoming the main attraction of the lounge. Burlesque marks Aguilera's first leading role, as well as Cher's first musical performance on screen.

Burlesque was released in the United States on November 24, 2010 by Screen Gems. Its jazz-inspired soundtrack was released ahead of the film's release on November 19, 2010 by RCA Records and Screen Gems. Aguilera and Cher both contributed to the album. The film received mixed reviews from critics, who praised the cast's performance and the soundtrack but criticized the cliche writing. Despite its mixed reception, the film did modestly at the box office, grossing $91 million worldwide and earning an additional $42 million in domestic video sales. The film earned a nomination for Best Motion Picture – Musical or Comedy at the 66th Golden Globe Awards, where Cher's performance of "You Haven't Seen the Last of Me", written by Diane Warren won the for Best Original Song. The soundtrack received a nomination at the 54th Grammy Awards for Best Compilation Soundtrack for Visual Media.

Plot
Alice "Ali" Marilyn Rose (Christina Aguilera) is a young waitress from Iowa who dreams of becoming a professional dancer following her mother's death during childhood.

After her selfish boss refuses salary, Ali steals from him and moves to Los Angeles. There Ali attends multiple auditions with little success. One night, Ali comes across a burlesque club where Tess Scali (Cher), the club's owner, and an entourage of dancers perform an opening number. Ali also meets songwriter Jack Miller (Cam Gigandet) at the club's bar. Jack refers her to Tess for an audition but she is told to come back another time and ushered out by her assistant Sean (Stanley Tucci). Upon seeing the waitress shortage, Ali picks up a tray and begins serving. As a result, she manages to get a job as a waitress at the club.

When Georgia (Julianne Hough), one of the leading dancers, becomes pregnant, auditions are held in search of a replacement to fill her role. Ali performs a difficult dance routine and eventually persuades Tess to hire her. This, however, infuriates Nikki (Kristen Bell), a lead performer struggling with alcoholism.

Ali replaces Nikki one night to host a performance after the latter is too intoxicated to perform. In a fit of rage, Nikki sabotages the performance by turning off the music that the dancers usually lip sync to until Ali impresses everyone with her singing skills. Her performance is an instant success to which Tess casts her in an upcoming show. Despite the club's growing popularity, Tess struggles with a bank loan indicted to her owning the rights of the building.

One night after the club closes, Tess grows increasingly worried about her financiallity before a drunken Nikki shows up, accusing Tess of rejecting their long friendship. In defense of Ali, Tess questions Nikki's gratitude for the help she has received during her binges. In retaliation, a furious Nikki quits after she reveals to have slept with Tess' ex-husband Vince (Peter Gallagher). Tess then angrily smashes the passenger side window on Nikki's convertible with a crowbar after she leaves.

Meanwhile, Ali and Jack become romantically attracted. However, Jack is already engaged to Natalie (Dianna Agron), an actress working in New York City. Sean encourages Jack to end the engagement, as Ali is a better person than his shallow fiancée. Marcus (Eric Dane), a wealthy clubgoer, becomes infatuated with Ali, who begins spending time with him, making Jack jealous. At Georgia's wedding, Jack appears to call off his engagement and becomes drunk. That night, Ali and Jack sleep together, beginning an affair. In the morning, Natalie unexpectedly returns from New York and finds the two in bed together. Natalie angrily insists she and Jack never broke up though the latter denies this but asks Ali to leave. Feeling heartbroken and betrayed, Ali runs to Sean for support, also learning that Sean is gay. Marcus calls Ali, and Sean prompts her to go out with him.

Ali learns that Marcus is interested in the "air rights" above the club; he hopes to build a skyscraper on the property. Distraught, Ali breaks off her relationship with Marcus. She later tells Tess about his plan, and they inform the owner (James Brolin) of new million-dollar condos being sold across the street. Fearing the obstruction of his prospective purchasers' view, he buys the air rights to the club's property from Tess. She then uses the money to buy out Vince's share, pay off the bank, and redecorate the club in her own vision. Later, a sobered Nikki admits that she lied about sleeping with Vince out of anger, and Tess rehires her.

Ali rekindles her relationship with Jack after he tells her about breaking up with Natalie, as she cared more about her job than her relationship with him. Having earned Nikki's respect, Ali performs "Show Me How You Burlesque", a song written by Jack, with all of the dancers on stage, delighting the crowd.

Cast

 Christina Aguilera as Alice Marilyn "Ali" Rose
 Cher as Tess Scali
 Cam Gigandet as John "Jack" Miller
 Kristen Bell as Nikki
 Stanley Tucci as Sean
 Eric Dane as Marcus Gerber
 Alan Cumming as Alexis
 Julianne Hough as Georgia
 Peter Gallagher as Vincent "Vince" Scali
 Dianna Agron as Natalie
 Glynn Turman as Harold Saint
 David Walton as Mark the DJ
 Terrence J as Dave
 Chelsea Traille as Coco
 Tyne Stecklein as Jesse
 Paula Van Oppen as Anna
 Michael Landes as Greg
 Tanee McCall as Scarlett
 Blair Redford as James / Bumper Band Member
 James Brolin as Mr. Anderson
 Stephen Lee as Dwight

Production
Steven Antin's sister Robin was a member of the girl band the Pussycat Dolls. Circa 2002, the group performed at the Roxy Theatre, West Hollywood, with multiple artists—among them Christina Aguilera—and Steven Antin directed some of these shows. The first outline of the screenplay was written by Antin and Clint Culpepper, the Screen Gems' president. It was about "a girl escaping her life", showing up in a neo-burlesque club and launching a career as a performer.

Cher accepted the supporting role of Tess Scali because she wanted to sing in a movie and thought this would be her last opportunity to do so. While on the film set, she went on to praise co-star Christina Aguilera's acting abilities, revealing to Entertainment Tonight: "She was keeping up, and she was hot. I mean, it was, like, she was really up there. Her game is good." Canadian actor Shawn Roberts, who was previously cast in another Screen Gems production Resident Evil: Afterlife, was briefly considered for the role of Jack Miller.

Burlesque started shooting on November 9, 2009 and ended on March 3, 2010.  Although director Steven Antin wrote the original screenplay, Diablo Cody (Juno) revised it uncredited. It was later further revised by Susannah Grant, also uncredited. Burlesque is Screen Gems' most expensive film, with the exception of the Resident Evil films, with costs of $55 million.

Filming locations included the exterior and adjacent parking as the "Burlesque Lounge" of the Ricardo Montalbán Theatre in Hollywood, as well as the interior of the Cathedral of Saint Vibiana.

The film marked Aguilera's film debut and Cher's first musical.

Music

Musical numbers

 "Something's Got a Hold on Me" – Ali and the Burlesque Lounge Troupe (performed by Christina Aguilera)
 "My Drag" – The Burlesque Lounge Troupe (a song by Deva Dragon & Squirrel Nut Zippers)
 "Welcome to Burlesque Tango" – The Band
 "Welcome to Burlesque" – Tess and the Burlesque Lounge Troupe (performed by Cher)
 "Diamonds Are a Girl's Best Friend (Swing Cats Remix)" –written by Leo Robin and Nikki, Georgia and the Burlesque Lounge Troupe (a song by Leo Robin and Jules Styne for the musical Gentleman Prefer Blondes])
 "Diamonds Are a Girl's Best Friend" – Ali (outro by Christina Aguilera)
 "Long John Blues" – Nikki (performed by Megan Mullally)
 "Nasty Naughty Boy" – Ali (a song by Christina Aguilera/instrumental version)
 "Wagon Wheel Watusi" – Ali (a song by Elmer Bernstein)
 "Ray of Light" – The Burlesque Lounge Troupe (a song by Madonna)
 "That's Life" – Alexis  (performed by Alan Cumming; DVD/Blu-ray special feature)
 "Tough Lover" – The Burlesque Lounge Troupe (a song by Etta James)
 "Tough Lover" – Ali (performed by Christina Aguilera)
 "But I Am a Good Girl" – Ali (performed by Christina Aguilera)
 "A Guy What Takes His Time" – Ali (performed by Christina Aguilera)
 "Express" – Ali and the Burlesque Lounge Troupe (performed by Christina Aguilera)
 "Jungle Berlin (Instrumental)" – Alexis and The Contortionists
 "You Haven't Seen the Last of Me" – Tess (performed by Cher)
 "Bound to You" – Ali (performed by Christina Aguilera)
 "Show Me How You Burlesque" – Ali and the Burlesque Lounge Troupe (performed by Christina Aguilera)

Soundtrack

The soundtrack album features ten tracks: eight performed by Aguilera including "Express";  and two performed by Cher which are her first original recordings in 7 years. The soundtrack includes a mix of original and cover songs. Both the ballads from the soundtrack – "Bound to You" performed by Aguilera and "You Haven't Seen the Last of Me" performed by Cher – were nominated for the Golden Globe Award for Best Original Song. Cher's "You Haven't Seen the Last of Me", which was written by Diane Warren, won the award. In the United States, the soundtrack was certified Gold by the RIAA for shipments of 500,000 copies in October 2011.

Release

Marketing
The theatrical trailer was attached to screenings of Step Up 3D and Easy A. The first TV spot premiered during the season 2 premiere of Fox's Glee on September 21, 2010. A third TV spot also aired the following day during Dancing with the Stars, later followed by another during MTV's Jersey Shore. Several teasers have been released for promotional purposes including the Etta James's "Something's Got a Hold on Me". This was then followed by the track "But I Am a Good Girl" which was released in November 2010.

Aguilera performed "Bound to You" on The Tonight Show with Jay Leno and gave an interview and performance on Conan. Aguilera also gave an interview to show host Chelsea Handler to discuss the film and other subjects. On November 19, 2010, Aguilera also gave a television interview to Ellen DeGeneres. She then performed a track from the soundtrack, the Etta James track "Something's Got a Hold on Me". Aguilera performed "Express" at the American Music Awards of 2010 and "Show Me How You Burlesque" at the Dancing with the Stars finale. She also performed "Express" on the final of the seventh series of The X Factor which received criticism and complaints for the raunchy content.

Home media
The DVD and Blu-ray were released in North America on March 1, 2011. A Blu-ray/DVD combo has been released as well. The DVD and Blu-ray sales exceed one million units and have grossed $20,563,918 in the United States alone; and, it is the 19th highest selling movie of the year. In all, the DVD has sold over 1.4 million units in the United States. Overall, it has grossed over $30,053,366 on video sales (DVD and Blu-ray sales) in United States alone.

Reception

Critical reception
Burlesque received mixed reviews from critics. On Rotten Tomatoes, the film has a rating of 37% based on 178 reviews, with an average rating of 4.90/10. The website's critical consensus reads, "Campy and clichéd, Burlesque wastes its talented cast (including a better-than-expected Christina Aguilera) on a movie that wavers uncertainly between 'bad' and 'so bad it's good.'" On Metacritic, the film holds a score of 47 out of 100, based on 38 reviews, indicating "mixed or average reviews".

Michael Phillips of the Chicago Tribune said, "The choicest dialogue in Burlesque provokes the sort of laughter that other, intentionally funny films only dream of generating." Mick LaSalle from San Francisco Chronicle gave the movie a full score and praised Aguilera's acting, calling her "jaw-droppingly good in several numbers" and said, "Aguilera knows how to listen to her fellow actors, to react and be spontaneous, and it makes all the difference". Kirk Honeycutt of The Hollywood Reporter called Burlesque "a refreshing throwback to movie musicals that celebrates its stars while indulging in sexy fun" and also praised Aguilera's acting and singing. Lou Lumenick of the New York Post said, "Aguilera can dance like nobody's business, but her acting debut isn't going to keep Anne Hathaway awake at night." Stanley Tucci's performance received praise from Entertainment Weekly and Empire thought the dance numbers were thrilling. Time Out labelled the drama "perfunctory" while Roger Ebert said that "Burlesque shows Cher and Christina Aguilera being all that they can be, and that's more than enough." Variety observed that the film "wants to be Cabaret, but lacks the edge and historical context to pull it off." The New York Times said that the story line "had already gathered dust by the time [of] the 1933 musical 42nd Street".

Box office
Burlesque was released on Wednesday, November 24, 2010, the day before Thanksgiving in the United States; on its opening day, it came in third to Harry Potter and the Deathly Hallows – Part 1 and Tangled. On Thursday, November 25, 2010, it dropped down to fourth place in the box office behind Harry Potter and the Deathly Hallows: Part 1, Tangled and Unstoppable and went down to fifth on Friday, November 26, 2010. On Sunday, November 28, 2010, it went back up to third place behind Tangled and Harry Potter and the Deathly Hallows: Part 1. It stayed in the top five until December 10, 2010, when it fell to sixth behind The Chronicles of Narnia: The Voyage of the Dawn Treader, The Tourist, Tangled, Harry Potter and the Deathly Hallows: Part 1 and Unstoppable. By the Christmas weekend, it was  number 15 at the box office.

The week after Thanksgiving, Burlesque experienced a substantial decrease on ticket sales, earning $9.65 million ($6.1 million for the weekend), for a total of $26.98 million for its first twelve days. , it had grossed $39.4 million in North America, and, $51.1 million in foreign countries, for a total of $91 million worldwide, and an additional $42 million in domestic video sales (DVD and Blu-ray).

Legacy
According to Joey Nolfi of Entertainment Weekly, since its release the movie "inspired everything, from drag queen revues to viral internet moments". Nolfi applauded Burlesque as "a campy, niche classic". In 2019, a full-length Burlesque tour, based on the movie, embarked, including at British venues. It starred Farrah Moan as Ali Rose and Chad Michaels as Tess Scali. The Burlesque stage musical was supposed to open at the Paper Mill Playhouse, New Jersey, in Autumn 2020, followed by a Broadway theatre adaptation, but the plans were cancelled due to the COVID-19 pandemic. The movie was also referenced in the third season of the VH1 reality show RuPaul's Drag Race All Stars. In a 2020 interview Antin revealed a "hybrid television event/series", based on the movie, was under development.

In January 2021, Madison Hubbell and Zachary Donohue won the gold medal at the U.S. Figure Skating Championships. During the 2020–21 season they danced to a medley of Aguilera's Burlesque songs, which included "Express".

Awards

References

External links

 
 
 
 
 

2010 films
2010 LGBT-related films
2010 romantic drama films
2010s dance films
2010s musical drama films
2010s romantic musical films
American dance films
American LGBT-related films
American musical drama films
American romantic drama films
American romantic musical films
Backstage musicals
Burlesque
Films about orphans
Films about singers
Films about striptease
Films produced by Donald De Line
Films scored by Christophe Beck
Films set in Iowa
Films set in Los Angeles
Films shot in Los Angeles
Screen Gems films
2010s English-language films
2010s American films